Pollok may refer to:

Places
 Pollok, Glasgow, Scotland
 Pollok Country Park 
 Pollok House
 Glasgow Pollok (UK Parliament constituency) (1918–2005)
 Glasgow Pollok (Scottish Parliament constituency)
 Pollock Castle, or Pollok Castle, in Scotland
 Pollok, New Zealand
 Pollok, Texas, U.S.

Other uses
 Pollok F.C., a Scottish football club
Artur Pollok (born 1972), Polish economist and diplomat
 Robert Pollok (1798–1827), Scottish poet
 Robert Pollok (British Army officer) (1884–1979)

See also
 Pollock (disambiguation)
 Pollack (disambiguation)
 Pollak, a surname